Trust Me is an American drama series created by Hunt Baldwin and John Coveny that aired for on TNT from January 26 to April 7, 2009. On April 10, 2009, TNT canceled the series after one season.

Synopsis
The series revolves around Rothman, Greene, and Moore, a fictional advertising firm. The storylines center on the difficulties of securing accounts and the characters' personal lives.

Cast
Tom Cavanagh – Conner, the firm's brilliant but irresponsible ad copywriter who began his partnership less than a decade ago with Mason. Twitchy Conner is a bachelor with a checkered history of failed romances and a growing debt to the company which he incurred by abusing the expense account.
Eric McCormack – Mason McGuire, the firm's newly promoted Creative Director and straitlaced family man. Mason's levelheaded nature often counteracts Conner's unpredictable behavior even though Mason is highly neurotic. He works well with Conner because of their work ethic but he has workaholic tendencies that affect his marriage.
Geoffrey Arend – Hector Culligan, one of the firm's idealistic young ad men who shares office space with colleague and best friend Mike, with whom he used to play Xbox games. Hector is known for celebrity impersonations.
Sarah Clarke – Erin McGuire, Mason's wife and mother to their son and daughter. She tolerates Mason's workaholic tendencies.
Mike Damus – Tom Fuller, Hector's colleague and one half of their team. He has been dating someone in their company.
Griffin Dunne – Tony Mink, the firm's boss who had a tendency to break promises in the wake of business, but still maintains a healthy relationship with his employees, primarily Mason.
Monica Potter – Sarah Krajicek-Hunter, the new hire and ad copywriter who regrets her hiring at the company. She is divorced and later finds out that her former husband is gay. She seems to be attracted to Conner.

Episodes

References

External links

2000s American workplace drama television series
2009 American television series debuts
2009 American television series endings
English-language television shows
Television shows set in Chicago
Television series by Warner Horizon Television
TNT (American TV network) original programming
Television series about advertising